Most Wanted is an American crime drama series  shown on ABC from October 16, 1976, until August 20, 1977. It stars Robert Stack, Jo Ann Harris, Shelly Novack, and Hari Rhodes. The series was created by Lawrence Heath, aka Leonard Heideman, a successful and prolific writer/producer who several years earlier was institutionalized for murdering his wife. This program marks the reunion of series star Stack with producer Quinn Martin, who had worked together previously on the ABC crime series The Untouchables.

Overview
The series focused on an elite task force of the Los Angeles Police Department named "Most Wanted". The mayor of Los Angeles, Dan Stoddard (Hari Rhodes), created the force to concentrate exclusively on criminals on the mayor's most-wanted list. In bringing them together, Mayor Stoddard specified "As few people as possible", and that their motto would be "Brainpower instead of manpower - focus instead of force".  Captain Linc Evers (Stack) headed the force accompanied by his two assistants (Harris and Novack) who used undercover tactics to bring down the city's most wanted and dangerous criminals. The series' original pilot featured a fourth member, played by Tom Selleck, but he was not used for the series. Actress Leslie Charleson was in the pilot as the female member of the unit, but was replaced in the series by Harris.

According to Robert Stack in his autobiography Straight Shooting, Most Wanted had become a top 10 Nielsen ratings hit, but was cancelled by ABC due to network politics after one season.

The theme song was composed by Lalo Schifrin and later used by the Sunburst Band for the house song "New York City Woman."

Most Wanted follows the same structure as other Quinn Martin dramas, including four labeled acts and an epilogue. However, the opening does not feature an announcer or pictures of that episode's guest stars (just their names are displayed), though the "tonight's episode" features a picture of that episode's enemy or key figure.

Cast
 Robert Stack as Captain Linc Evers
 Hari Rhodes  as Mayor Dan Stoddard
 Shelly Novack as Sergeant Charlie Benson
 Jo Ann Harris as Officer Kate Manners

Episodes

Home media
On March 20, 2018, CBS Home Entertainment released the Complete Series on DVD in Region 1. This is a Manufacture-on-Demand (MOD) release, available from Amazon.com through their CreateSpace MOD program and other online retailers.

References

External links
 
 Most Wanted series intro (YouTube video)
 Most Wanted Theme by Lalo Schifrin
 

1970s American crime television series
1976 American television series debuts
1977 American television series endings
Fictional portrayals of the Los Angeles Police Department
American Broadcasting Company original programming
American detective television series
English-language television shows
Television series by CBS Studios
Television shows set in Los Angeles